Switchbacks Training Stadium is a 5,000-seat soccer-specific stadium built in Colorado Springs, Colorado. At an altitude of roughly 6,600 feet above sea-level, the stadium was at the highest elevation of any primary home stadium used by a professional team in the American soccer pyramid through the 2020 season. The stadium is immediately adjacent to UCHealth Park.

After Colorado Springs Switchbacks FC were awarded a franchise in USL Pro, now known as the USL Championship, it was announced on June 14, 2014, that the Colorado Springs City Council had approved an agreement that gave the new franchise a ten-year lease on the site. On March 7, 2016, Sand Creek Stadium had a name proposal approved by the City of Colorado Springs Parks Department, and the name was changed to Switchbacks Stadium. This happened to avoid further confusion with the name of the nearby Sand Creek High School. On February 14, 2017, Weidner Apartment Homes purchased the stadium naming rights for an undisclosed amount, and the stadium was renamed Weidner Field.

The "Weidner Field" name is now used for an 8,000-seat stadium in downtown Colorado Springs that opened in April 2021 as the new home of Switchbacks FC. The new venue, although sitting at a lower altitude of 6,035 feet, will remain the highest in elevation used by an American professional soccer team. The "Weidner Field" name was officially transferred from the old stadium to the new downtown venue on October 15, 2020.

References

External links
 Switchbacks Website
Weidner Apartment Homes

Colorado Springs Switchbacks FC
Sports venues in Colorado Springs, Colorado
Soccer venues in Colorado
Tourist attractions in Colorado Springs, Colorado
1985 establishments in Colorado
Sports venues completed in 1985
USL Championship stadiums